Kashima (written: 鹿島) is a Japanese surname. Notable people with the surname include:

Hitomi Kashima (born 1980), Japanese swimmer
Satoshi Kashima, Japanese civil engineer
Seibei Kashima (1866–1924), Japanese photographer
Sho Kashima (born 1986), American freestyle skier 
Takehiro Kashima (born 1980), Japanese gymnast

Fictional characters
Miyuki Kashima, one of the eponymous characters in the manga and anime series Miyuki
Yukari Kashima, fictional character in Vampire Princess Miyu
Yū Kashima, fictional character in Monthly Girls' Nozaki-kun
Kashima Reiko, in the urban legend Teke Teke
Todd Kashima, a SATO Marine in Call of Duty: Infinite Warfare 

Japanese-language surnames